Cobria biroi is a species of beetle in the family Cerambycidae. It was described by Stephan von Breuning in 1953. It is known from Papua New Guinea.

References

Pteropliini
Beetles described in 1953